Baron Conrad Mardefelt, formally Conrad von Maesberg, friherre Marderfelt (c. 1610-1688) was a Field Marshal of Sweden (1675).  He was a nobleman of Pomeranian origin.

After having distinguished himself as a fortification officer with Lennart Torstensson, he was entrusted with the command of all the Swedish fortifications on German soil, in 1646. He became General in 1673 and then Field Marshal.

King Charles created him a freiherr in 1677 with the baronial name Marderfelt (from which some literature has tended to drop one -r- for some reason).

He was the father of Arvid Axel Mardefelt.

Sources

The article Conrad Mardefelt in Nationalencyklopedin (1994).

Swedish nobility
Field marshals of Sweden
1610s births
1688 deaths
17th-century Swedish military personnel